Zalesny is a rural locality (a khutor) in Kalach, Kalacheyevsky District, Voronezh Oblast, Russia. The population was 310 as of 2010. There are 8 streets.

Geography 
Zalesny is located 12 km west of Kalach (the district's administrative centre) by road. Kalach is the nearest rural locality.

References 

Rural localities in Kalacheyevsky District